Quintus Aurelius Symmachus (floruit 446) was an aristocrat of the Western Roman Empire. He was appointed consul by the western court, together with general Flavius Aetius, in 446.

Biography 
Aurelius Symmachus was a member of the Symmachi family. He was probably the son of Quintus Fabius Memmius Symmachus (and therefore grandson of the orator Quintus Aurelius Symmachus), and he was likely the father of Quintus Aurelius Memmius Symmachus. He may also be the Symmachus to whom Macrobius Ambrosius Theodosius dedicated the work .

Bibliography 
 Arnold Hugh Martin Jones, John Robert Martindale, John Morris, "Q. Aurelius Symmachus 9", The Prosopography of the Later Roman Empire, Cambridge University Press, 1971, pp. 1046.

5th-century Romans
5th-century Roman consuls
Imperial Roman consuls
Quintus